Michael Kerrigan (2 November 1952 – 7 August 2014) was a British television director noted for directing The Famous Five TV series and the children's show No. 73.  He also directed the Doctor Who serial Battlefield in 1989. In 2008 he returned to the Doctor Who universe to direct four episodes of the spin-off series The Sarah Jane Adventures.

Kerrigan spent several years on the staff of the ITV network's south of England franchise-holder TVS, and his first credit was as a "Programme Associate" on the first edition of No. 73 to be made at the company's Maidstone studios.

Filmography

Jackanory (1965)
Angels (1975)
Spine Chillers (1980)
A Little Silver Trumpet (1980)
Maggie (1981 to 1982)
Secrets (1982)
Brookside (1982)
The Baker Street Boys (1983)
Dramarama
"The Universe Downstairs" (1985)
Knights of God (1987)
Jim Henson Presents Mother Goose Stories (1987 and 1989)
Mr Majeika (1988)
Doctor Who
Battlefield (4 parts, 1989)
The Bill
"Old Friends" (1990)
"Ground Rules" (1990)
"Come Fly with Me" (1990)
Parallel 9 (1992)
Three Seven Eleven (1993)
The Wild House (1996)
The Famous Five
"Five Get into a Fix" (1996)
"Five on a Treasure Island" Part One and Two (1996)
"Five Get into Trouble" (1996)
"Five Fall into Adventure" (1996)
"Five Go Off to Camp" (1996)
"Five on Finniston Farm" (1996)
"Five Go to Smuggler's Top" Part One and Two (1996)
"Five Go to Demon's Rocks" (1996)
"Five Go Down to the Sea" Part One and Two (1996)
"Five Run Away Together" (1996)
"Five Go to Mystery Moor" (1996)
"Five Go Adventuring Again" (1997)
"Five on a Secret Trail" (1997)
"Five Go to Billycock Hill" Part One and Two (1997)
"Five Have a Mystery to Solve" (1997)
The Phoenix and the Carpet (1997)
Verdict
"Split Second" (1998)
Ministry of Mayhem (2004)
The Courtroom
"One in Six" (2004)
The Basil Brush Show
"Big Bother" (2003)
"Basil's Haunted House" (2006)
"There's No Business Like Snow Business" (2006)
Coronation Street
Episode #1.6520 (2007)
Episode #1.6521 (2007)
Episode #1.6522 (2007)
Episode #1.6571 (2007)
The Sarah Jane Adventures
The Day of the Clown (2 parts, 2008)
Secrets of the Stars (2 parts, 2008)

References

External links
 

1952 births
British television directors
2014 deaths